Albert Ayguesparse (1900–1996) was a Belgian writer.

Bibliography

Essays
 Machinismes et culture
 Magie du capitalisme

Poetry
 Neuf offrandes claires (1923)
 Le Vin noir de Cahors (1957 – Prix Engelman)
 Langage

Novels
 La main morte
 Notre ombre nous précède (Prix Rossel 1952)
 Une génération pour rien (1954 – Prix triennal du roman).

References

Sources
 Albert Ayguesparse (French)
 Albert Ayguesparse (French)

1900 births
1996 deaths
Writers from Brussels
Belgian poets in French
20th-century Belgian poets
Members of the Académie royale de langue et de littérature françaises de Belgique